is a Japanese professional shogi player ranked 9-dan. He is a former Kisei, Kiō, and Ōshō title holder.

Early life
Minami was born in Kishiwada, Osaka on June 8, 1963. He entered the Japan Shogi Association's apprentice school at the rank of 5-kyū in 1975 as a protegee of shogi professional . He obtained full professional status and the rank of 4-dan in January 1981.

Shogi professional
Minami is a member of the so-called Shōwa 55 group (55年組), a group of eight strong players that become professional in 1980–1981 (year 55 of the Shōwa period) and won numerous shogi tournaments.

In January 2018, Minami became the 20th shogi professional to win 800 official games and be awarded Shogi Honor Fighting-spirit Award by the JSA.

Playing style
Minami is known for his steady style of starting games slowly as for his quiet manner and strict seiza posture during games. For these reasons, his style is often referred to as the  after the Jizō statues common to Japanese Buddhism.

Promotion history
The promotion history for Minami is as follows:
 5-kyū: 1977
 1-dan: 1978
 4-dan: January 19, 1981
 5-dan: April 1, 1982
 6-dan: April 1, 1983
 7-dan: April 1, 1985
 8-dan: April 1, 1986
 9-dan: February 22, 1989

Titles and other championships
Minami has appeared in major title matches a total of sixteen times, and has won seven major titles. In addition to major titles, Minami has won six non-title championships during his career.

Major titles

Other championships

Note: Tournaments marked with an asterisk (*) are no longer held.

Awards and honors
Minami has received a number of awards and honors throughout his career for his accomplishments both on an off the shogi board. These include awards given out annually by the JSA for performance in official games as well as other JSA awards for career accomplishments, and awards received from governmental organizations, etc. for contributions made to Japanese society.

Annual shogi awards
10th Annual Awards (April 1982March 1983): Best New Player, Best Winning Percentage, Most Consecutive Games Won
13th Annual Awards (April 1985March 1986): Most Consecutive Games Won
15th Annual Awards (April 1987March 1988): Distinguished Service Award
16th Annual Awards (April 1988March 1989): Fighting-spirit Award
17th Annual Awards (April 1989March 1990): Technique Award

Other awards
1988, November: Kishiwada City Meritorious Citizen Award
2003: Shogi Honor Award (Awarded by the JSA in recognition of winning 600 official games as a professional)
2005: 25 Years Service Award (Awarded by the JSA in recognition of being an active professional for twenty-five years)
2018: Shogi Honor Fighting-spirit Award (Awarded by JSA in recognition of winning 800 official games as a professional)

References

External links
ShogiHub: Professional Player Info · Minami, Yoshikazu

1963 births
Japanese shogi players
Living people
Professional shogi players from Osaka Prefecture
Kisei (shogi)
Kiō
Ōshō
People from Kishiwada, Osaka
Professional shogi players